Walter Robertson may refer to:

 Walter M. Robertson (1888–1954), United States Army officer
 Walter S. Robertson, United States Assistant Secretary of State for Far Eastern Affairs 1953–1959
 Walter W. Robertson (1845–1907), 19th-century Scottish architect
 Walter Robertson (artist), Irish miniature painter